Owl, in comics, may refer to:

Owl (Marvel Comics), a Marvel Comics supervillain
Owl (Dell Comics), a Dell Comics superhero
Owlman (character), character in DC Comics

See also
Owl (disambiguation)